The 1929 New Mexico A&M Aggies football team was an American football team that represented New Mexico College of Agriculture and Mechanical Arts (now known as New Mexico State University) during the 1929 college football season.  In their first year under head coach Jerry Hines, the Aggies compiled a 3–2–3 record and shut out three opponents. The team played its home games on Miller Field, sometimes also referred to as College Field.

Schedule

References

New Mexico AandM
New Mexico State Aggies football seasons
New Mexico AandM Aggies football